Children's songs are songs for children, which may include nursery rhymes set to music, songs that children invent and share among themselves, or modern creations intended for education or entertainment. 

Children's songs may also refer to:
 Children's Songs (Chick Corea album), 1984
 Children's Songs (Li-Ron Choir album), 2012
6 Children's Songs, Op.66 (1914) by Alexander Gretchaninov
Six voice and piano songs by Muriel Herbert (1897–1984):
"Children's Song 1: Merry-go-round" (Ada Harrison) [1938]
"Children's Song 2: The Gypsies" (Ada Harrison) [1938]
"Children's Song 3: The Tadpole" (Ada Harrison) [1938]
"Children's Song 4: Jack Spratt" (Ada Harrison) [1938]
"Children's Song 5: Acorn and Willow" (Ada Harrison) [1938]
"Children's Song 6: The Bunny" (Ada Harrison) [1938]

See also
Children's music, a genre of music for children
Two songs for children, a list of compositions by Frederick Delius